The Tuscaloosa Amphitheater is an outdoor amphitheater in Tuscaloosa, Alabama, USA that is used primarily for music performances. It has a seating capacity of 7,470.

The amphitheater is located on Jack Warner Parkway, just beside the Hugh R. Thomas Bridge, only minutes away from the University of Alabama campus and blocks from downtown Tuscaloosa. It is the largest outdoor theater in West Alabama.

History
The Tuscaloosa Amphitheater, designed by Davis Architects and built by Harrison Construction, broke ground on July 14, 2009, with an opening date estimated for August 2010. In the next few months, the Tuscaloosa area experienced record rainfall, delaying the opening until 2011.

Kenny Chesney, along with Uncle Kracker, were originally set to open the amphitheater with a concert on March 31, 2011, but scheduling conflicts led to the show being moved back to May 25. It was later announced that The Avett Brothers and Band of Horses would open the amphitheater on April 1, 2011, followed by Patti LaBelle and The O'Jays the next night.

See also
 List of contemporary amphitheaters

References

External links
  City of Tuscaloosa Amphitheater Official Site

Event venues established in 2011
2011 establishments in Alabama
Amphitheaters in the United States
Music venues in Alabama
Buildings and structures in Tuscaloosa, Alabama
Tourist attractions in Tuscaloosa, Alabama